Nidahase Piya DS is a 2018 Sri Lankan Sinhala biographical film directed by Suneth Malinga Lokuhewa and co-produced by Wijeyadasa Rajapakshe, Dilman Jayaratne, Channa Hettiarachchi, Rajaputhra Weerasinghe, Kithsiri Athulathmudali and Clarance Kumarage. It stars an ensemble cast of many popular actors, with Lakshman Mendis in the lead role, with Thumindu Dodantenna and Saranga Disasekara in supportive roles. Music composed by Samantha Perera. It is the 1313th Sri Lankan film in the Sinhala cinema.

The film revolves around the life of Sri Lanka's first prime minister, D.S. Senanayake, who is known as the "Father of the Nation".  The film trailer and the theme song were released on 4 February 2018, the 70th anniversary of the country's independence. A private screening of the film was held for the family relatives of D.S. Senanayake, which was organised by the director.

Prior to screening in Sri Lanka, the film has scheduled to screen in several other countries such as Australia, New Zealand and Canada with the participation of Sri Lankans living there.

The film was shot in Ranminitenna cinema village, Meerigama and places around Kandy, Peradeniya and Bogambara prison.

Plot
It depicts the life of Rt. Hon. D.S. Senanayake, known as the "Father of the Nation" and his dedication to build an independent Ceylon.

Cast
The film comprises an ensemble cast with many popular and award-winning artists of all generations.

 Lakshman Mendis as D.S. Senanayake
 Thumindu Dodantenna as young D.S. Senanayake
 Saranga Disasekara as S. W. R. D. Bandaranaike
 Richard Manamudali as Oliver Goonetilleke
 Kamal Deshapriya as Dudley Senanayake
 Somasiri Alakolange as Ponnambalam Ramanathan
 Udith Abeyrathna as J. R. Jayewardene
 Palitha Silva as F. R. Senanayake 
Isuru Lokuhettiarachchi as young F. R. Senanayake
 G.R Perera as Don Spater Senanayake, Father of D. S. Senanayake
 Janak Premalal as E. W. Perera
 Sajeewa Rajaputhra as John Kotelawala
 Buddhadasa Vithanarachchi as D. B. Jayatilaka
 Nayana Hettiarachchi as Dona Catherina Elizabeth Perera, Mother of D. S. Senanayake
 Susantha Chandramali as Molly Dunuwila, wife of D. S. Senanayake
Thisuri Yuwanika as Young Molly Dunuwila
 Eranga Jeewantha as D. R. Wijewardena
 Sanjeewa Dissanayaka as C. W. W. Kannangara
 Roshan Pilapitiya as D. C. Senanayake
 Nirosha Thalagala as Grace Dunuwila
 Jayalal Rohana as James Peiris
 Athula Jayasinghe as A. E. Goonesinghe
 Pujitha de Mel as Henry Pedris
 Chandika Nanayakkara as D.C.P. De Silva
 Kriz Chris Henri Harriz as Chief clerk
 Douglas Ranasinghe as Richard Aluwihare
 Milinda Perera as G.G. Ponnambalam
 Sriyantha Mendis as Wrestling coach
 Gamini Hettiarachchi as Wrestling commentator
 Anura Bandara Rajaguru as Salesman
 Vasantha Vittachchi as Chief monk
 Akasha Pathirana as Arthur V. Dias
 Dilip Manohara as Piyadasa Sirisena
 Udeni Alwis as Ponnambalam Arunachalam
 Sarath Chandrasiri as Driver Karolis
 Hemasiri Liyanage as D. D. Pedris
 Sriyani Mahawatte as Mallino Pedris
 Nayomi Thakshila as Hilda Pedris
 Thesara Jayawardane as Dr. Perera
 Kumara Thirimadura as School principal
 Dayadeva Edirisinghe as Servant in Orchid house
 Sandun Wijesiri as Indian doctor
 Pavithra Wickramasinghe as Ellen Atigala
 Ayodya Rathnasiri as Mary Senanayake
 Ranjan Prasanna as Reporter
 Sasthriya Rajaputhra as Atigala
 Nanda Wickramage as Ven. Sri Subhuthi Thero
 Richard Mundy as Judge
 Michael Schram as Andrew Boner-Law

Songs

References

External links
 
 Nidahase Piya DS on YouTube
 Nidahase Piya DS on Facebook
 නිදහසේ පියා විශේෂ දැක්මක්
 Film Review: Father of Independence
 Nidahase Piya DS does not incite, but deter violence’
 එක පැත්තක ඩී.එස් අනෙක් පැත්තේ විජේවීර

2010s Sinhala-language films
2018 films
Sri Lankan political films
Cultural depictions of prime ministers of Sri Lanka